Bas van Erp (2 July 1979 – 3 April 2016) was a Dutch wheelchair tennis player.

He won two bronze medals at the 2004 Paralympic Games; one in the quad singles event and the other one in the quad doubles event. After the 2004 Games he was about to stop playing wheelchair tennis, because he became very ill. When he recovered he decided to reach the Paralympic Games one more time. He competed at the 2008 Summer Paralympics, as in 2004 in the quad singles event and the quad doubles event but didn't win a medal.

In daily life he was receptionist and accountant. He died in his house in Liempde at the age of 36.

Achievements
2004
 quad singles event 2004 Summer Paralympics
 quad doubles event 2004 Summer Paralympics
2nd singles event 2004 Wheelchair Tennis Masters (Amersfoort)
2008
1st doubles event 2008 Camozzi Wheelchair Tennis Doubles Masters (Bergamo) (together with Johan Andersson (SWE))

References

External links
 Official website
 
 

1979 births
2016 deaths
Paralympic bronze medalists for the Netherlands
Paralympic medalists in table tennis
Paralympic wheelchair tennis players of the Netherlands
People from Boxtel
Sportspeople from North Brabant
Wheelchair tennis players
Wheelchair tennis players at the 2004 Summer Paralympics
Wheelchair tennis players at the 2008 Summer Paralympics
Medalists at the 2004 Summer Paralympics
Paralympic medalists in wheelchair tennis